Cecilia M. Seares-Luna (born March 31, 1953) is a Filipino politician. A member of the Liberal Party, she was elected Member of the House of Representatives of the Philippines representing the Lone District of Abra from 2007 to 2010.

References

 

People from Abra (province)
1953 births
Living people
Liberal Party (Philippines) politicians
Members of the House of Representatives of the Philippines from Abra (province)
Women members of the House of Representatives of the Philippines
Lakas–CMD politicians